Can't Get Enough is the fourth album by English reggae musician Eddy Grant, released in 1981 on Grant's own label Ice Records. It was his UK chart debut, peaking at #39 on the album charts. It features the UK hits "Do You Feel My Love", "Can't Get Enough Of You" and "I Love You, Yes I Love You". The photography was by David Bailey.

Track listing
All tracks composed by Eddy Grant
"Do You Feel My Love" – 3:01
"Time to Let Go" – 4:47
"That Is Why" – 4:28
"I Love to Truck" – 6:07
"Can't Get Enough of You" – 4:21
"Give Yourself to Me" – 3:37
"I Love You, Yes I Love You" – 3:52
"Kill 'Em with Kindness" – 4:29
"California Style" – 4:04

Personnel
Eddy Grant - lead vocals, backing vocals, bass guitar, electric guitar, drums, percussion, keyboards, piano, synthesizer
Sonny Akpan - congas
Jimmy Haynes - bass guitar on "That Is Why"
Marcus James - bass guitar on "Give Yourself to Me"
Doreen Henry, Rosemary Hibbert - backing vocals on "That Is Why" and "Give Yourself to Me"
Technical
Frank Aggarat - engineer
Dave Field - artwork
David Bailey - cover photography

References

1981 albums
Eddy Grant albums